is a Japanese footballer who plays as a forward for SC Sagamihara from 2023.

Career 
On 20 December 2022, Kuribara joined to J3 club, SC Sagamihara for upcoming 2023 season.

Personal life 
Kurihara was born in Tokorazawa  to his Ghanaian father and Japanese mother.

Club statistics
.

References

External links 
 

2001 births
Living people
Japanese footballers
Japan youth international footballers
Association football forwards
J1 League players
J3 League players
Shimizu S-Pulse players
Azul Claro Numazu players
Fukushima United FC players
SC Sagamihara players
Japanese people of Ghanaian descent
Sportspeople of Ghanaian descent